Het is een schone dag geweest  is a 1993 Dutch documentary film directed by Jos de Putter.

Synopsis
The film is a portrait of Putter's family and their life on the farm.

References

External links 
 

1993 films
1990s Dutch-language films
1993 documentary films
Dutch documentary films
Documentary films about agriculture